Christ the Redeemer (standard) is an Art Deco statue of Jesus Christ in Rio de Janeiro, Brazil, created by French sculptor Paul Landowski and built by Brazilian engineer Heitor da Silva Costa, in collaboration with French engineer Albert Caquot. Romanian sculptor Gheorghe Leonida sculpted the face. It is made of reinforced concrete and soapstone. Christ the Redeemer differs considerably from its original design, as the initial plan was a large Christ with a globe in one hand and a cross in the other. Although the project organisers originally accepted the design, it later changed to the statue of today, with the arms spread out wide.

The statue weighs 635 metric tons (625 long, 700 short tons), and is located at the peak of the  Corcovado mountain in the Tijuca National Park overlooking the city of Rio de Janeiro. A symbol of Christianity around the world, the statue has also become a cultural icon of both Rio de Janeiro and Brazil and was voted one of the New Seven Wonders of the World.

History 

Vincentian priest Pedro Maria Boss first suggested placing a Christian monument on Mount Corcovado in the mid-1850s to honor Princess Isabel, regent of Brazil and the daughter of Emperor Pedro II, but the project was not approved. In 1889, the country became a republic, and owing to the separation of church and state the proposed statue was dismissed.

The Catholic Circle of Rio made a second proposal for a landmark statue on the mountain in 1920. The group organized an event called Semana do Monumento ("Monument Week") to attract donations and collect signatures to support the building of the statue. The organization was motivated by what they perceived as "Godlessness" in the society. The donations came mostly from Brazilian Catholics. The designs considered for the "Statue of the Christ" included a representation of the Christian cross, a statue of Jesus with a globe in his hands, and a pedestal symbolizing the world. The statue of Christ the Redeemer with open arms, a symbol of peace, was chosen.

Local engineer Heitor da Silva Costa and artist Carlos Oswald designed the statue. French sculptor Paul Landowski created the work.

In 1922, Landowski commissioned fellow Parisian Romanian sculptor Gheorghe Leonida, who studied sculpture at the Fine Arts Conservatory in Bucharest and in Italy.

A group of engineers and technicians studied Landowski's submissions and felt building the structure of reinforced concrete (designed by Albert Caquot) instead of steel was more suitable for the cross-shaped statue. The concrete making up the base was supplied from Limhamn, Sweden. The outer layers are soapstone, chosen for its enduring qualities and ease of use.

In October 2006, on the 75th anniversary of the statue's completion, Cardinal Eusebio Oscar Scheid, Archbishop of Rio, consecrated a chapel, named after Brazil's patron saint—Our Lady of the Apparition—under the statue, allowing Catholics to hold baptisms and weddings there.

Lightning struck the statue during a violent thunderstorm on February 10, 2008, causing some damage to the fingers, head and eyebrows. The Rio de Janeiro state government initiated a restoration effort to replace some of the outer soapstone layers and repair the lightning rods on the statue. Lightning damaged it again on January 17, 2014, dislodging a finger on the right hand.

In 2010, a massive restoration of the statue began. Work included cleaning, replacing the mortar and soapstone on the exterior, restoring iron in the internal structure, and waterproofing the monument. Vandals attacked the statue during renovation, spraying paint along the arm. Mayor Eduardo Paes called the act "a crime against the nation". The culprits later apologized and presented themselves to the police.

In reference to Brazil striker Ronaldo's usual goal celebration of both arms outstretched, the Pirelli tyre company ran a 1998 commercial in which he replaced the statue while in an Inter Milan strip. The commercial was controversial with the Catholic Church.

Restoration

In 1990, several organizations, including the Archdiocese of Rio de Janeiro, media company Grupo Globo, oil company Shell do Brasil, environmental regulator IBAMA, National Institute of Historic and Artistic Heritage, and the city government of Rio de Janeiro entered into an agreement to conduct restoration work.

More work on the statue and its environs was conducted in 2003 and early 2010. In 2003, a set of escalators, walkways, and elevators were installed to facilitate access to the platform surrounding the statue. The four-month restoration in 2010 focused on the statue itself. The statue's internal structure was renovated and its soapstone mosaic covering was restored by removing a crust of fungi and other microorganisms and repairing small cracks. The lightning rods located in the statue's head and arms were also repaired, and new lighting fixtures were installed at the foot of the statue.

The restoration involved one hundred people and used more than 60,000 pieces of stone taken from the same quarry as the original statue.  During the unveiling of the restored statue, it was illuminated with green-and-yellow lighting in support of the Brazil national football team playing in the 2010 FIFA World Cup.

Maintenance work needs to be conducted periodically because of the strong winds and erosion to which the statue is exposed, as well as lightning strikes. The original pale stone is no longer available in sufficient quantity, and replacement stones are increasingly darker in hue.

Similar structures 

 Christ the Protector in Encantado, Rio Grande do Sul, Brazil (43 m)
 Christ the Redeemer in Rio Verde, Goiás, Brazil
 Christ in the Mount in Pitangui, Minas Gerais, Brazil
 Cristo del Otero in Palencia, Spain built in 1930 (21 m) 
 Sacred Heart of Jesus Monument, in Oviedo, Spain built in 1980 (30 m) 
 Cristo Rey located on the Cerro del Cubilete in Guanajuato, Mexico, inspired by Rio's Christ the Redeemer (23 m)
 Cristo Rey in Tenancingo, México, México (30 m)
 Christ Blessing in Manado, North Sulawesi, Indonesia (30 m)
 Christ of Havana in Havana, Cuba, inspired by Christ the Redeemer (20 m)
 Christ of the Abyss in various underwater locations
 Christ of the Ozarks in Arkansas, United States, inspired by Rio's Christ the Redeemer (20 m)
 Christ of Vũng Tàu in Vietnam (32 m)
 Christ the King in Świebodzin, Poland (33 m)
 Christ the Redeemer of the Andes (Argentina/Chile)
 Christ the Sacred Heart of Jesus, Ibiza, Spain, inspired by Christ the Redeemer (23 m)
 Cristo Blanco in Cusco, Peru
 Cristo de la Concordia in Cochabamba, Bolivia (34 m)
 Cristo de las Noas in Torreón, Mexico (22 m)
 Cristo del Pacífico in Lima, Peru, erected in 2011 (37 m)
 Patung Yesus Kristus in Mansinam Island, West Papua, Indonesia (30 m)
 Cristo Redentore (Christ the Redeemer) of Maratea, Italy (21 m)
 Cristo Rei (Christ the King) in Almada, Portugal (28 m)
 Cristo Rei of Dili in Dili, Timor-Leste (27 m)
 Cristo Rei, Madeira on Madeira island, completed in 1927 (15 m)
 Cristo Rei in Lubango, Angola (14 m)
 Statue of Cristo Luz in Balneário Camboriú, Santa Catarina, Brazil
 Statue of Jesus Christ on the top of Sagrat Cor, Barcelona, Spain
 Tas-Salvatur, Malta (12 m)
 Statue of Jesus Christ, Monte Urgull, Donostia-San Sebastian, Spain (12 m)
 Jesus de Greatest in Imo, Nigeria, Africa's tallest statue of Jesus and fifth tallest statue on the continent (8.53 m)
 Christ at El Picacho in Tegucigalpa, Honduras
 Cristo Redentor, Puerto Plata, Dominican Republic
 Christ the King in Lebanon
 Another imitation statue of Christ the Redeemer is at Nellore, Andhra Pradesh, India (Shrish Patil)
 Imitation at St. Joseph Shrine, Vizhinjam, near Trivandrum, Kerala, India
 Imitation at Ecopark, Kolkata, India
 Christ the Redeemer of Malacca is on the Portuguese Settlement Square in Melaka, Malaysia (20' tall)
 Cristo Rey in Cali, Colombia (26 m)
 Cristo Rey by Urbici Soler in Sunland Park, New Mexico (8.83 m)
 Cristo Redentor in Barranca Province, Lima Region, Peru
 Cristo Rey Tijuanense, at Iglesia de San Martín de Porres near Colonia Los Álamos, Tijuana, Baja California, México (23 m 30 cm)

Gallery

See also
 List of statues of Jesus
 List of tallest statues

References

Further reading

External links 

 
 Corcovado Train
 Map 
 
 Map 
 Sanctuary of Christ the Redeemer at Google Cultural Institute

 
1931 sculptures
Art Deco sculptures and memorials
Cultural infrastructure completed in 1931
Colossal statues of Jesus
Concrete sculptures in Brazil
Monuments and memorials in Rio de Janeiro (city)
Mountain monuments and memorials
National heritage sites of Rio de Janeiro (state)
Outdoor sculptures in Brazil
Stone sculptures in Brazil
Vandalized works of art in Brazil